Liponyssus is a genus of bird mites in the family Macronyssidae. There are at least two described species in Liponyssus.

Species
These two species belong to the genus Liponyssus:
 Liponyssus canadensis Banks
 Liponyssus cyclapsis Oudemans

References

Mesostigmata
Articles created by Qbugbot